In U.S. legal procedure, each party to a lawsuit has the duty to disclose certain information, such as the names and addresses of witnesses, and copies of any documents that it intends to use as evidence, to the opposing party.  This duty is subject to certain exceptions, as outlined in the Federal Rules of Civil Procedure; furthermore, the rules applicable in state courts vary from state to state.

In United States patent law, during patent prosecution, an applicant has a duty to disclose all information material to patentability. Breach of this duty can lead to a holding of inequitable conduct, in which case the patent is unenforceable.

In the United Kingdom and in Australia, in relation to insurance, duty of disclosure refers to the obligation of the insured person or proposed insured person to disclose to the insurer every matter that he or she "know[s], or could reasonably be expected to know, is relevant to the insurers' decision whether to accept the risk of insurance" or to influence the terms offered.

See also
Duty of confidentiality (limits of the duty of confidentiality)
Duty of candor
Information disclosure statement (U.S. patent law)

References

Further reading 
 

Civil procedure
Discovery (law)
United States patent law